Anna Sierpińska (born 1947) is a Polish-Canadian scholar of mathematics education, known for her investigations of understanding and epistemology in mathematics education. She is a professor emerita of mathematics and statistics at Concordia University.

Education and career
Sierpińska earned a master's degree in 1970 from the University of Warsaw, specializing in commutative algebra. She completed her Ph.D. in mathematics education in 1984 at the Higher School of Pedagogy, Cracow.

She was editor-in-chief of Educational Studies in Mathematics from 2001 to 2005.

Recognition
In 2006, Luleå University of Technology in Sweden gave Sierpińska an honorary doctorate.

Selected publications

Monograph

Edited volumes

Articles

References

External links
Home page

1947 births
Living people
Canadian mathematicians
Canadian women mathematicians
Polish mathematicians
Polish women mathematicians
Mathematics educators
University of Warsaw alumni
Academic staff of Concordia University